The Queensland Family History Society (QFHS) is an incorporated association formed in Brisbane, Queensland, Australia.

History 
The society was established in 1979 as a non-profit, non-sectarian, non-political organisation. They aim to promote the study of family history local history, genealogy, and heraldry, and encourage the collection and preservation of records relating to the history of Queensland families.

At the end of 2022, the society relocated from 58 Bellevue Avenue, Gaythorne to its new QFHS Family History Research Centre at 46 Delaware Street, Chermside.

References

External links 
 

Non-profit organisations based in Queensland
Historical societies of Australia
Libraries in Brisbane
Family history
Genealogical societies